is a Japanese swimmer who competes in the Women's 400m individual medley. At the 2012 Summer Olympics she finished 12th overall in the heats in the Women's 400 metre individual medley and failed to reach the final.

References

Living people
Olympic swimmers of Japan
Swimmers at the 2012 Summer Olympics
Japanese female medley swimmers
Year of birth missing (living people)